Jonas Richard Tomalty is a Canadian rock, soul and pop singer. First known as Jonas in 2004 as a solo singer, he was the lead singer of the Canadian rock band Jonas & The Massive Attraction from 2010 to 2017. In 2022, he released his fourth solo album, Undivided, as Jonas Tomalty.

Career

Early career
Tomalty started a rock band called Rubberman in high school. In 1999, Rubberman won first prize at CHOM-FM's annual "CHOM L'Esprit" contest as well as the  "" contest. The band signed to Donald K Donald's Aquarius Records label and released the Rubberman LP. That same year Tomalty formed a blues side project, Jonas & The Blues Blooded, featuring his father, Rick Tomalty, on harmonica.

Solo career 
In 2004, Tomalty released a cover of "Edge of Seventeen" (originally performed by Stevie Nicks), which was the first track on the Jonas EP. It was followed by the original singles "Show Me", "Daddy" and "Like a River". After the release of the EP, Rubberman opened for Van Halen on their North American tour.

The EP earned two nominations at the Juno Awards of 2004 in the "New Artist of the Year" and "Rock Album of the Year" categories. His second album, Suite Life, was released in October 2006 and featured  its first single "Bows and Arrows".
In 2007, Tomalty released Promised Land, his third album. The album was never distributed outside of Canada due to a conflict between the band and their record label, which resulted in the label dropping the band. Afterwards, Jonas & The Massive Attraction went on a cross-Canadian tour with Collective Soul.

Jonas & The Massive Attraction

In 2010 Jonas formed Jonas & The Massive Attraction and released the album "Big Slice" 
The first single "Big Slice" was released to radio across Canada and Europe.
The band toured Canada and Europe several times over the next 3 years. 

The 2013 album release Live Out Loud (co-written and produced by Marti Frederiksen) was a success, with "Respire" reaching #2 on the Quebec Francophone charts. The second Francophone adaptation "Je Crie Ton Nom" (co-written by Simon Wilcox, Nelson Minville and Mark Holman) became Jonas' first SOCAN #1 single. Jonas subsequently collaborated with producer Fred St-Gelais and singer with Marie-Mai on the single "Jamais Trop Tard", which reached #1 on the charts. The trio subsequently collaborated on the single "Christmas Calling", written by Tomalty.

In 2014, they released Album X as Jonas & The Massive Attraction. The album included seven original songs, such as "Lifeline" (co-written by Raine Maida of Our Lady Peace), and 3 re-recordings of past successes such as "Bows & Arrows", "Daddy" and "Burn the House Down". The band toured this album for the next few years and cut a live version of the show for the release of Live & Electric in 2017.

In April 2022 he released the album "Jonas Tomalty Undivided" with a new band and adding his family name to the project.

Discography

As Jonas
 2004: Jonas
 2006: Suite Life
 2007: Promised Land (compilation album of Jonas and Suite Life)

As Jonas and The Massive Attraction
 2010: Big Slice
 2011: Big Slice Unplugged EP (EP)
 2011: Big Slice: Deluxe Edition (re-release of Big Slice which includes the EP)
 2012: Unplugged
 2013: Live Out Loud
 2014: X (Tenth anniversary album including 7 new songs and 3 remixes)
 2017: Live & Electric (Live Album)

Videography
 2005: Jonas Live ...As We Roll! (DVD)
 2007: La Quête
 2009: Live at the Bell Centre (DVD)
 2012: Big Slice Tour 2012 / Live in Germany at Rockpalast

References

External links

 
 

Living people
Canadian rock singers
Singers from Montreal
21st-century Canadian male singers
Year of birth missing (living people)